Neepa T. Maitra is a theoretical physicist and Professor of Physics at Hunter College of the City University of New York and the Graduate Center of the City University of New York. She is most well known for her contributions to theoretical chemistry and chemical physics, especially in the development of accurate functionals in time-dependent density functional theory and correlated electron-ion dynamics.

Early life and education 
Maitra was born and raised in  New Zealand and completed her bachelor's degree in physics at the University of Otago. She went on to get her Ph.D. in physics at Harvard University in the lab of Eric "Rick" Heller and postdoc at the University of California, Berkeley and Rutgers University.

Awards 
Maitra received an NSF Career Award for her work in Theoretical and Computational Chemistry.

References  

New Zealand physicists
Hunter College faculty
University of Otago alumni
Harvard University alumni
Living people
Year of birth missing (living people)